The 1976 UK & Ireland Greyhound Racing Year was the 50th year of greyhound racing in the United Kingdom and Ireland.

Roll of honour

Summary
The National Greyhound Racing Club (NGRC) released the annual returns, with totalisator turnover down, at £66,657,176 and attendances up, recorded at 6,517,864 from 5923 meetings. The sport remained the UK's second most popular spectator sport behind football and Ireland's most popular sporting pastime.

Peruvian Style equalled Westpark Mustard's world record. Mutts Silver, a fawn dog trained by Phil Rees Sr. and Westmead Champ, another fawn dog trained by Pam Heasman were voted joint winners of the Greyhound of the Year. Mutts Silver won the premier event the 1976 English Greyhound Derby and Westmead Champ won the Gold Collar at Catford Stadium, the St Leger at Wembley Greyhounds and the Regency. A new system of selecting the greyhound of the year was inaugurated; it involved thirteen members of the greyhound press voting for one greyhound each. Mutts Silver and Westmead Champ ended with six votes each and were declared joint winners.

The Greyhound Racing Association (GRA) Property Trust relied on a scheme of arrangement that was organised to stop the once great greyhound company from going into liquidation, they owed £15 million to creditors. The remaining GRA greyhound racing tracks were left to pay the creditors by virtue of payments from their operating profit.

Tracks
Two bookmaking giants Corals and Ladbrokes came directly into greyhound racing, Corals purchased Romford from Romford Stadium Ltd, headed by Managing Director Archer Leggett, the same man that had started the track in 1929. They invested heavily with a new grandstand, restaurant and track facilities. John Sutton became the new Managing Director and Sidney Wood became the new Racing Manager. Coral also bought Brighton, which received new investment and the track would go on to beat Shawfield Stadium in the final of the National Intertrack. Ladbrokes had been beaten to the purchase of the two tracks by Corals denying Ladbrokes the opportunity to own eight tracks in total because they had just purchased Totalisators and Greyhound Holdings (TGH) on 6 February. TGH owned six stadia at Brough Park, Crayford & Bexleyheath, Leeds, Gosforth, Willenhall and Monmore. However they were successful in acquiring a seventh track in July, when they purchased Perry Barr. Arthur Aldridge, formerly of the Greyhound Racing Association, joined Ladbroke as Racing Director.

Former Oaks winning trainer Mick Hawkins bought Ramsgate, under the name Northern Sports (parent company Hawkins of Harrow) from Dumpton (Thanet) Greyhounds Ltd for £185,000. His son David Hawkins was the Managing Director of Northern Sports who also owned the independent Doncaster Greyhound Track.

The unsold Oxford Stadium was renamed Cowley Stadium under a caretakers Don Joyce and Peter Jones and Maidstone opened following an agreement with Horace Luper and the Maidstone United Football Club. Salford closed on 30 July.

News
Charles Chandler Sr. (the Walthamstow Stadium Chairman) died. Wimbledon Stadium introduced sectional timing and was one of the first tracks to use the system of grading in classes. A Romford bitch called Go Ahead Girl recorded 17 consecutive wins.

Prominent sire Newdown Heather died at Jack Mullan's kennels aged 12. His progeny included Dolores Rocket, Westpark Mustard and Time Up Please.

Competitions
A white and blue dog called Xmas Holiday won both the Laurels at Wimbledon and the Scurry Gold Cup at Slough Stadium.

Ireland
American tracks were increasing in number and with the 22 Irish tracks in operation the demand in breeding increased. Irish bred greyhounds increased in value as a consequence. Peruvian Style returned after his winter rest in a quest to beat Westpark Mustard's world record. After winning the Callanan Cup at Harold's Cross Stadiums the sequence stood at 16 consecutive wins. Two runs and wins with a track record in 29.28 seconds, during the Truboard Gold Cup at Waterford extended the run to 18 just one short of Mick the Miller and two less than Westpark Mustard. However an injury sustained in the final would leave him side-lined for six months. Peruvian Style returned to action in October with the defence of his Waterford Glass Stakes title. In the first round he won but pulled up lame after the race resulting in a one-month break. He was then entered at his home track Galway for the Federation Championship. A heat win enabled him to overtake Mick the Miller and equal Westpark Mustard's world record. A record attendance watched the final and witnessed an incredible shock when a greyhound called Pet Ace defeated Peruvian Style and the world record was not surpassed. He was immediately retired and put to stud duties. A greyhound called Tain Mor was voted Irish Greyhound of the Year despite the exploits of Peruvian Style

Principal UK races

Totalisator returns

The totalisator returns declared to the licensing authorities for the year 1976 are listed below.

References 

Greyhound racing in the United Kingdom
Greyhound racing in the Republic of Ireland
UK and Ireland Greyhound Racing Year
UK and Ireland Greyhound Racing Year
UK and Ireland Greyhound Racing Year
UK and Ireland Greyhound Racing Year